Sarah Bäckman (born 8 December 1991) is a Swedish real estate broker, former professional wrestler and arm wrestler. She is a former eight-time World Arm Wrestling Champion. Bäckman also competed as "Spirit" on the Swedish version of MGM Television's Gladiators franchise. From 2013 to 2014, Bäckman was signed to WWE, working in their developmental territory NXT.

Arm wrestling career
Bäckman began arm wrestling at age 14.  She is one of the most decorated women's arm wrestlers in the world. An eight-time World Arm Wrestling Champion, eight-time European Arm Wrestling Champion and 11-time Swedish Arm Wrestling Champion. She retired from arm wrestling to pursue a wrestling career in May 2013 when she decided to sign with WWE.

Bäckman portrays Gladiator "Spirit" on the Swedish version of Gladiators (or Gladiatorerna as the show, which airs on TV4, is referred to in Sweden). Bäckman replaced “Stinger”, who was portrayed by Cajsa Nilsson. In an article for a Swedish newspaper (Aftonbladet), Bäckman referred to being a Gladiator as "a childhood dream" of hers.

Professional wrestling career
In March 2013, it was reported that Bäckman signed a developmental contract with WWE and would report to their developmental territory NXT. Bäckman's ring name was revealed as Shara on 10 February 2014.

Bäckman requested and was granted her release from her contract on 30 April 2014.

Personal life 
Bäckman married Taylor Rotunda, who at the time was signed to WWE under the ring name Bo Dallas, on June 26, 2014. In 2015, Bäckman started a career as a real estate broker. Bäckman and Rotunda divorced in 2019.

References

External links

Sportspeople from Stockholm
Living people
1991 births
Swedish arm wrestlers
Swedish female professional wrestlers
Swedish expatriate sportspeople in the United States
Female arm wrestlers